La Rivière is an unincorporated community recognized as a local urban district in Manitoba, Canada. It is located 11 km west of the town of Manitou on Highway 3. It is located in the Municipality of Pembina. La Riviere was founded 1886 by Metis Franco-Manitobans, however it is predominantly English speaking.  It has a post office, credit union, a five-lift ski hill, a construction company, and a seasonal drive-in restaurant. It has a full service campground at the edge of the community that backs onto the Pembina River. La Riviere was previously home to Hamm-tone Guitars and Mandolins and the Pembina Valley Guitar Building Course.

Demographics 

Gallery

See also 
List of regions of Manitoba
List of rural municipalities in Manitoba

References

External links 

Designated places in Manitoba
Local urban districts in Manitoba